Lulu is a 1953 Italian drama film directed by Fernando Cerchio.

Plot 
Mario, a student from a noble Milanese family, falls in love with Lulù, a young slender girl. While the student is at Lulu's house, her protector arrives and gives him the keys to the apartment. Mario, who had naively believed in Lulu's good faith, leaves the house upset. When she returns after some time, he no longer finds her than she does: she has left the apartment and returned to live with her parents, people of questionable principles, who suggest that their daughter pretend to be pregnant. Mario, feeling responsible, marries Lulu against the wishes of his family and continues his studies in Milan, finding accommodation in the countryside in a house left by his grandmother. Lulu begins to find country life boring and resumes an old relationship. When Mario is warned by an anonymous letter, he rushes home and surprises Lulu with her lover. The latter, threatened by Mario, shoots him, but hits Lulu who stood between the two.

Cast
 Valentina Cortese - Lulù
 Jacques Sernas - Mario
 Luigi Pavese - Stefano
 Marcello Mastroianni - Soletti
 Paola Borboni - Virginia
 Luigi Cimara - Farnesi
 Mario Ferrari - Mister Franchi
 Flora Mariel - Teresa
 Anna Maria Padoan - Giustina
 Umberto Onorato - Suitor
 Pina Piovani - Mrs. Salvi
 Laura Gore - The Venetian maid

References

External links

1953 films
1953 drama films
Italian drama films
1950s Italian-language films
Italian black-and-white films
Films directed by Fernando Cerchio
1950s Italian films